05:22:09:12 Off is an album by industrial/EBM group Front 242 released by Sony on 2 November 1993. The album peaked at #27 on the CMJ Radio Top 150.

The album's title is a simple substitution cipher for the word "evil"; where each letter is represented by its equivalent numerical position in the alphabet. The album was unusual in that it primarily features a female voice, that of Christine "99" Kowalski, on vocals, with Jean-Luc De Meyer only appearing on a few tracks.

Reception

Track listing

Track 14 & 15 on CD version only.

Personnel 

Daniel Bressanutti – Producer, Mixing
Patrick Codenys – Producer, Mixing
John Dubs – Producer
Bob Ludwig – Mastering
Eran Westwood – Producer, Mixing 
Jean-Luc De Meyer – vocals
Kristin Kowalski – vocals
Daniel Bressanutti – keyboards, programming, live mixing
Patrick Codenys – keyboards, programming, samplers
Richard Jonckheere, often credited as "Richard 23" – percussion, vocals

References

External links

1993 albums
Front 242 albums
Red Rhino Records albums
Epic Records albums